Joseph Nathaniel Greene (April 9, 1920 in New York  -  September 26, 2010 in Essex, CT) was a US diplomat. 

In 1942 entered the US foreign service. Served in junior diplomatic posts in Canada until 1944. In 1944 was posted in Algeria, which was recently recovered by the Allied Powers from Vichy France control. In 1944-1949 served in various positions in Italy. Served as US representative in Egypt from February 1972 to July 1973. Over the years he also had postings to Singapore, Germany, the United Kingdom and India.

External links
 Professional CV
 Hartford Courant Obituary

1920 births
2010 deaths
American diplomats
American expatriates in Canada
American expatriates in Algeria
American expatriates in Italy
American expatriates in Egypt
American expatriates in the United Kingdom
American expatriates in Nigeria
American expatriates in Germany
American expatriates in India